Beyrich

Surname
Notable people with the surname include:

  (1887–1961), German politician
 Heinrich Ernst Beyrich (1815–1896), German paleontologist
 Heinrich Karl Beyrich (1796–1834), German botanist

Places
Barish; old spelling (by Guerin) of this village in Lebanon